Nasiru Mohammed (born 6 June 1994) is a Ghanaian professional footballer who plays as a right winger.

Club career

Early career 
Mohammed started his career at age nine by joining Kumasi based Lazio Football Club (under 12 to under 17) and later promoted to Rainbow FC a division three team in Kumasi Ghana at the time In 2010, he was promoted to the first team of the third tier Division Two League club of Rainbow FC. He played two years with the senior team and was later loaned out to BK Häcken in 2012.

BK Häcken 
On 23 August 2012, Mohammed joined BK Häcken on an initial loan with a possibility of becoming a permanent move in future. He made his debut for BK Häcken on 26 August 2012 against IF Elfsborg. After only six minutes he scored his first goal which meant 2–2. Five minutes later he scored again. The match ended 4–2 to BK Häcken. After scoring four goals in only seven games, on 6 October 2012 BK Häcken pulled the sold option from Rainbow FC and he signed a four-year contract.

Levski Sofia 
On 23 July 2019, he was sold for €250 000  to Levski Sofia in a three-year deal. He scored his first goal for the club in a 1–5 cup match victory against Spartak Varna on 25 September 2019. He scored again on 12 July 2020 against Lokomotiv Plovdiv, but unfortunately his team lost the match 1-2 and will not play in UEFA Europa League for the 2020/21 season. His third goal for Levski came on 19 September 2020 in league match against CSKA 1948 which his team won 3–0.

International career
Mohammed was previously the captain of the Ghana national under-17 football team. He has played for the Ghana national under-20 football team since 2011. He was called up to the senior Ghana squad for a World Cup qualifier against Egypt in October 2017.

Career statistics

Club

Honours
BK Häcken
Svenska Cupen (2): 2015–16, 2018–19

References

External links 
 Profile at LevskiSofia.info

1994 births
Living people
Ghanaian footballers
Ghana under-20 international footballers
Allsvenskan players
First Professional Football League (Bulgaria) players
BK Häcken players
PFC Levski Sofia players
Association football forwards
Ghanaian expatriate footballers
Expatriate footballers in Sweden
Expatriate footballers in Bulgaria
Footballers from Kumasi
Ghanaian expatriate sportspeople in Sweden
Ghanaian expatriate sportspeople in Bulgaria